William T. Stachowski (born February 14, 1949) is an American politician from New York.

Biography
Stachowski attended Bishop Ryan High School in Buffalo, New York. He graduated from the College of the Holy Cross in Worcester, Massachusetts, where he played Varsity Football. He was All New England and won the Davitt award as the Holy Cross best defensive player. He entered politics as a Democrat, and was a member of the Erie County Legislature (3rd D.). In November 1981, he was elected to the New York State Senate, to fill the vacancy caused by the resignation of Raymond F. Gallagher],and took his seat during a special session on December 3, 1981.

He was re-elected many times, and remained in the Senate until 2010, sitting in the 184th, 185th, 186th, 187th, 188th, 189th, 190th, 191st, 192nd, 193rd, 194th, 195th, 196th, 197th and 198th New York State Legislatures.

Stachowski chaired the Commerce, Economic Development and Small Business Committee. This committee works closely with the Empire State Development Corporation. Stachowski also sat on the Public Authorities Control Board and the Legislative Commission on the Development of Rural Resources. He was also a member of the Upstate Caucus

On December 2, 2009, Stachowski was one of eight Democratic state senators to vote against same-sex marriage in New Yorksame-sex marriage legislation, which failed to pass the Senate.

He worked closely with SUNY Buffalo President John B. Simpson to carry out the UB 2020 plan. Stachowski sponsored and passed legislation in support of UB 2020 in the Senate. In 2010, he ran for re-nomination, but was defeated in the Democratic primary by Erie County Legislator Tim Kennedy. Kennedy went on to win the general election.

References

1949 births
Living people
Democratic Party New York (state) state senators
Politicians from Buffalo, New York
County legislators in New York (state)
American politicians of Polish descent
21st-century American politicians
20th-century American politicians